Dayton-Williams House is a historic home located at Middle Granville in Washington County, New York.  It was built about 1820 and is a two-story, five bay, center entrance, gable end brick building.  It is in the Federal style. Also on the property is a retaining wall of fieldstone and slate and the foundation of a dwelling house built to house railroad workers in the 19th century.

It was listed on the National Register of Historic Places in 2006.

References

Houses on the National Register of Historic Places in New York (state)
Federal architecture in New York (state)
Houses completed in 1820
Houses in Washington County, New York
National Register of Historic Places in Washington County, New York